South Korean boy band BTS has released nine studio albums (one of which was reissued under a different title), seven compilation albums, and six extended plays. In December 2018, BTS surpassed 10 million albums sold, setting the record for reaching that milestone in the shortest span of time (5½ years) among all Korean acts to have debuted since 2000, with five million of those albums being sold in South Korea that year alone. By April 2020, the group had sold over 20 million physical albums in South Korea, becoming the best-selling Korean act of all time in less than seven years. As of December 2022, they have sold over 38 million albums domestically.

The group debuted in South Korea on June 13, 2013, with the single album 2 Cool 4 Skool. They made a comeback in September 2013 with an extended play, O!RUL8,2?. In February 2014, BTS released their second extended play, Skool Luv Affair. This marked the first time their album charted on the Billboard World Albums chart and Japan's Oricon Albums Chart. A repackaged version of the album, Skool Luv Affair Special Addition, was released in May. The group's first studio album, Dark & Wild, followed in August and became their first album to break into the US Top Heatseekers chart. To wrap up the year, BTS made their Japanese debut in December with their first Japanese-language studio album Wake Up. All of their Japanese singles—"No More Dream", released on June 4; "Boy in Luv", released on July 16; and "Danger", released on November 19—made it into the top 10 of the Oricon Albums Chart and the Japan Hot 100.

BTS' third and fourth extended plays, The Most Beautiful Moment in Life, Pt. 1 and The Most Beautiful Moment in Life, Pt. 2, were released in April and November 2015 respectively. The latter earned them their first entry on the Billboard 200 at number 171. The EP also topped the Billboard Top Heatseekers and World Albums charts for four weeks, the most by a South Korean act. The group's first compilation album, The Most Beautiful Moment in Life: Young Forever, was released in May 2016, followed by their second Japanese studio album, Youth, in September. Youth sold over 44,000 copies on its first day and became BTS' first studio album to top both the daily and weekly Oricon album charts. The group released their second studio album Wings, in October. It debuted at 26 on the Billboard 200, making it the highest-ranking Korean album in the chart's history at the time. Its reissue, You Never Walk Alone, was released in February 2017. Their fifth extended play, Love Yourself: Her, was released in September 2017. The EP opened at number seven on the US Billboard 200 with 31,000 album-equivalent units, making it the highest-charting K-pop album on the chart and biggest sales week of a K-pop album to date.

In April 2018, they released their third Japanese studio album, Face Yourself. It debuted at number 43 on the Billboard 200 with 12,000 album-equivalent units, making it the third-highest-charting Japanese album in the history of the chart. Just one month later, it became their first Japanese album to be certified Platinum by the RIAJ, having sold over 250,000 copies within that time. BTS's third Korean studio album, Love Yourself: Tear, was released on May 18, 2018 and debuted at number one on the Billboard 200, becoming the group's highest-charting album in a Western market, as well as the first K-pop album to top the US albums chart and the highest-charting album by an Asian act. BTS had the second-best total album sales in the US in 2018 behind Eminem, and accounted for 22.6% of the total albums sold in Korea that year. In 2019, the group scored their third number-one with Map of the Soul: Persona, their sixth extended play, on the Billboard 200, making them the first group since the Beatles in 1996 to have three number one albums in less than a year. The EP became the best-selling album in South Korean history, selling nearly 3.4 million copies in two months. They broke the all-time domestic sales record again with their fourth Korean studio album, Map of the Soul: 7, which sold 4.1 million copies in less than nine days since its release in early 2020 and gave BTS their fourth US number-one album.

Studio albums

Reissues

Compilation albums

Soundtrack albums

Extended plays

Single albums

Notes

References

Discographies of South Korean artists
Hip hop group discographies
K-pop music group discographies